Large-flowered everlasting is a common name for several plants and may refer to:

Anaphalis margaritacea
Helichrysum macranthum